WMWM is a non-commercial radio station at 91.7 Megahertz in Salem, Massachusetts, licensed to Salem State University. The station was founded as WSSC AM 640 (carrier current) in 1968 and became WMWM at 91.7 FM in 1976 with a power of 10 watts. Power was increased to 130 watts in 1978.

The station features alternative rock with specialty shows devoted to local artists, blues, talk, doo wop, and acoustic music. It broadcasts 24 hours a day utilizing computerized automation playlists when a live DJ is not available.

Among the past DJs of WMWM are: Anngelle Wood, now with WZLX in Boston; Esoteric (rapper) of the hip-hop duo 7L & Esoteric; Jay Brown on air personality at WKAF 97.7 The Beat; Curtis Atchinson, Owner of SoundGroove Records (Midnight Society); Chris Kennedy, now with Beasley Media in Boston; and cartoonists Keith Knight (The Knight Life) and Mark Parisi (Off the Mark). Longtime DJ "Cosmic" Amanda Guest founded community radio station BFF.fm in San Francisco, CA.

Two of the stations legendary on air DJs were Scott Merrill Mezansky (a/k/a Mike Elliott) and Bob Nelson. Scott hosted a soft rock/oldies show from 1978–1987. Bob has hosted The Juke
Joint, a blues program (with two other hosts) on Sundays continuously since 1988 and has been a DJ since 1981. Another longtime DJ, Shaun Hayes, played jazz and progressive talk shows and
was with the station for over 15 years. Hayes died on May 12, 2013. Also some DJs of note were Joe DiFranco also known as "Hank the Engineer" Also, Stephen Lochiatto who hosted several radio programs including punk, rock and jazz as well as broadcasting Salem State Basketball and Hockey games with John Clemeno and John Caron who also hosted several outstanding radio programs. Pam Kavenaugh was also a well known on air personality as well as being the stations General Manager.

Doug Mascott hosted local music program "Trax of the Town" from 1999 until his death in March 2014.

Automation 
WMWM features automated playlist technologies, such as automated weather reports and news updates for college students. By utilizing text-to-speech software, WMWM is able to automatically provide information via voice to morning commuters and other listeners.

Streaming radio 
WMWM began streaming radio on October 6, 2008. Although WMWM has started an online presence, it does not plan on terminating FM presence in the future. Presently, WMWM uses Shoutca.st and is available at wmwmsalem.com

References

External links

MWM
Radio stations established in 1976
Salem State University
Salem, Massachusetts
Mass media in Essex County, Massachusetts
1976 establishments in Massachusetts